The Reis telephone was an invention named after Philipp Reis of a telephone-like device he constructed.  Reis's first successful work is dated to October 1861.

History
In 1861, Philipp Reis succeeded in creating a device that captured sound, converted it to electrical impulses which were transmitted via electrical wires to another device that transformed these pulses into recognizable sounds similar to the original acoustical source.  Reis coined the term telephon to describe his device.

In 1862, Reis demonstrated his telephone to Wilhelm von Legat, Inspector of the Royal Prussian Telegraph Corps who produced an account of it (Legat, 1862), a translation of which was obtained by Thomas Edison in 1875 and which was used in Edison's successful development of the carbon microphone. The Legat account included drawings that are different from that below, suggesting that it is of a later version. Edison acknowledged his debt to Reis thus:
The first inventor of a telephone was Phillip Reis of Germany only musical not articulating. The first person to publicly exhibit a telephone for transmission of articulate speech was A. G. Bell. The first practical commercial telephone for transmission of articulate speech was invented by myself. Telephones used throughout the world are mine and Bell's. Mine is used for transmitting. Bell's is used for receiving.

Microphone 
As Reis was considering his invention as a means of broadcasting music, he termed his microphone the 'singing station'. The Reis microphone was based on a horizontal parchment diaphragm as a sound transducer. The diaphragm was mounted on the top of a closed wooden sound box, with a speaking horn on the front. Sound received by the horn caused the diaphragm to vibrate. Above this were two brass strips, later with two platinum contacts, originally with a single platinum contact and the lower contact formed of a drop of mercury in a recess in the end of the screw. One strip was glued to the centre of the diaphragm; another strip, usually two strips in a V, was mounted above this. The strip's own weight gave a light pressure between the contacts.

Sound vibrations caused the diaphragm and lower contact to vibrate in sympathy. This changed the resistance between the two contacts, giving an electrical signal to the telephone line.

Patent dispute 
There was some question as to the operation of the microphone. It is regarded today as having varied the resistance of the contacts. However Reis's own description claimed that the contacts opened and closed. At the time, it was held that a circuit with such a 'make and break' circuit was incapable of transmitting intelligible speech. Reis's device had been used to transmit speech from 1861, and widely publicly demonstrated from 1863, yet when Bell's patent claim was set against Reis's primacy of inventing the telephone this 'inability' for it to work because of its use of a "false theory" was enough to (legally) portray Reis's invention as invalid, thus allowing Bell to claim novelty.

Loudspeaker

Reis's speaker worked by magnetostriction. In his first receiver he wound a coil of wire around an iron knitting needle and rested the needle against the F hole of a violin. As current passed through the needle, the iron shrank and a click was produced.  The image, below, shows an advanced version where the iron bar is clamped to a cigar-box-shaped resonator.  This receiver is not very sensitive. It produces weak sound but has good fidelity. It requires very high current and is a current-sensitive device rather than a voltage-sensitive device.

This instrument could transmit continuous musical tones but produced indistinct speech. In 1865, however, British scientist David E. Hughes used the Reis telephone with "good results".

See also 
 Telephone
 History of the telephone
 Invention of the telephone
 Timeline of the telephone
 List of German inventors and discoverers

References 

 Legat, V. 1862. "Reproducing Sounds on Extra Galvanic Way". accessed 26 March 2006.
 Friedrich Georg Wieck, Otto Wilhelm Ålund "Uppfinningarnas bok" vol. II, 1874.
 Thompson, Sylvanus P. "Philipp Reis, Inventor of the Telephone" London: E. & F.N. Spon, 1883.
 Coe, Lewis "The Telephone and Its Several Inventors: A History" Chapter 2, McFarland & Co, 1995.

External links 
 "The Great Telephone Mystery" accessed September 5, 2006
 BBC - Bell 'did not invent telephone' - Dec 1 2003

Telephony equipment
History of the telephone
German inventions
1861 in science